Lapus is a surname. Notable people with the surname include:

 Jeci Lapus (1953–2021), Filipino engineer and politician
 Jesli Lapus (born 1949), Filipino politician
 John Lapus (born 1973), Filipino actor, host, director, and comedian
 Jojo Lapus (1945–2006), Filipino showbiz columnist and screenwriter